Ji-seok is a Korean masculine given name. Its meaning depends on the hanja used to write each syllable of the name. There are 46 hanja with the reading "ji" and 20 hanja with the reading "seok" on the South Korean government's official list of hanja which may be registered for use in given names.

People with this name include:
James Kim Ji-seok (born 1940), South Korean Roman Catholic priest, Bishop of the Diocese of Wonju
Kim Ji-seok (actor) (born Kim Bo-seok, 1981), South Korean actor
Seo Ji-seok (born So Jong-uk, 1981), South Korean actor 
Kim Ji-seok (Go player) (born 1989), South Korean professional Go player

Fictional characters with this name include:
Ji-suk, from 2003 South Korean film Madeleine
Seo Ji-suk, from 1999 South Korean television series Happy Together

See also
List of Korean given names

References

Korean masculine given names